Beneventum (Latin for 'good wind') may refer to :

 Benevento, city in southern Italy
 Duchy of Benevento
 Beneventum (Africa), former city and diocese in Roman Africa, now a Latin Catholic titular bishopric
 Beneventum Plantation House in South Carolina